The 2020 New Brunswick general election was held on September 14, 2020, to elect members of the 60th New Brunswick Legislature. The Progressive Conservative Party of New Brunswick, led by Blaine Higgs, won a majority government.

The writs of election were issued by Lieutenant Governor Brenda Murphy on August 17, 2020, after a request was made by Premier Blaine Higgs to dissolve the legislature.

The election was scheduled to take place on October 17, 2022, as determined by the fixed-date provisions of the Legislative Assembly Act, which requires a general election to be held every four years on the third Monday in October. However, Premier Higgs called a snap election after negotiations failed with the other parties that would have avoided an election until the fixed date in 2022 or the end of the COVID-19 pandemic.

At 8:55 p.m. ADT, CBC News declared a Progressive Conservative majority government.

Background

Aftermath of the 2018 election

The 2018 provincial election resulted in no party winning a majority of seats in the legislature for the first time since the 1920 provincial election. On election night, Blaine Higgs claimed victory for the Progressive Conservative Party, saying his team had received a mandate from New Brunswickers; however, Liberal Party leader and incumbent premier Brian Gallant stated his intention to remain in office with a minority government by securing support on a vote-by-vote basis. Over the following days, Lieutenant Governor Jocelyne Roy-Vienneau met with both leaders and gave permission to Gallant to continue in office and attempt to seek the confidence of the Legislative Assembly; while Higgs was told that if Gallant was unable to secure the confidence of the Assembly, Higgs would be called on to form government.

After the election, both Kris Austin of the People's Alliance and David Coon of the Green Party were noncommittal in their support. Gallant pursued a partnership with the Green Party and ruled out any arrangement with the Progressive Conservative Party or People's Alliance because Gallant did not believe that they shared the Liberal Party’s “values”. Higgs initially ruled out any formal agreements with other parties, but later said that a four-year agreement would be ideal for stability. On September 28, 2018, Austin agreed to support a Progressive Conservative minority government on a "bill-by-bill basis" for eighteen months, though no formal agreement was made.

On November 2, 2018, the Progressive Conservatives introduced a motion of no confidence in the Legislative Assembly, resulting in a 25–23 vote against the Liberals. Subsequently, Gallant resigned as Premier and recommended to the Lieutenant Governor that Higgs be given the opportunity to form government. Higgs' minority government was sworn into office on November 9, 2018.

On November 15, 2018, Gallant announced his resignation as leader of the Liberal Party. He was succeeded by Kevin Vickers on April 24, 2019.

Speculation of an early election

The PC minority government's seat total dropped to 20 after the death of MLA Greg Thompson on September 10, 2019 and the resignation of Deputy Premier Robert Gauvin on February 14, 2020. Gauvin's resignation came after the PC government announced health reforms, including the nightly closure of six hospital emergency rooms across the province as a cost reduction measure. Despite the Progressive Conservatives quickly backtracking on their proposals, the Liberals and the Greens said that they would not support the government at the next confidence vote, while the People's Alliance specifically did not rule out a vote of non-confidence. The next confidence vote was scheduled for March 20, 2020 to approve the PC government's proposed budget for the upcoming fiscal year; however, by that time, the People's Alliance decided to continue supporting the government and Green MLAs were allowed to vote freely on the budget. Furthermore, after COVID-19 was declared a pandemic on March 11, 2020, all parties decided to co-operate with each other—thus, avoiding a spring election.

However, by the summer, COVID-19 cases had stayed low for several weeks and Premier Blaine Higgs began to hint at the possibility of a fall election, arguing that stability was required for the next phase of the pandemic and economic recovery. The Progressive Conservatives carried out candidate riding nominations on August 8, 2020, continuing speculation of when an election might be called. On the following Monday, Higgs made an offer to the opposition parties to avoid an election until 2022 or the end of the pandemic; however, negotiations ultimately failed and a snap election was called on August 17, 2020.

Summary of seat changes

Results

|-
! colspan=2 rowspan=2 | Political party
! rowspan=2 | Party leader
! colspan=5 | MLAs
! colspan=4 | Votes
|-
! Candidates
!2018
!Dissol.
!2020
!±
!#
!%
! ± (pp)
!% whererunning

|align=left|Blaine Higgs
|49
|22
|20
|27
| +7
|147,790
|39.34%
| +7.45pp
|39.34%

|align=left|Kevin Vickers
|49
|21
|20
|17
| −3
|129,025
|34.35%
| −3.45pp
|34.35%

|align=left|David Coon
|47
|3
|3
|3
| ±0
|57,252
|15.24%
| +3.36pp
|16.00%

|align=left|Kris Austin
|36
|3
|3
|2
| −1
|34,526
|9.19%
| −3.39pp
|12.51%

|align=left|Mackenzie Thomason (interim)
|33
|–
|–
|0
| –
|6,220
|1.66%
| −3.35pp
|2.46%

|align=left|KISS
|align=left|Gerald Bourque
|4
|–
|–
|0
| −
|139
|0.04%
| −0.06pp
|0.43%

| style="text-align:left;" colspan="2"|Independent
|9
|–
|1
|0
| −1
|685
|0.18%
| −0.56pp
|1.32%

| style="text-align:left;" colspan="4"|Vacant
|2
| colspan="5"|
|-style="background:#E9E9E9;"
|-style="background:#E9E9E9;"
|colspan="8" align="left"|Ballots rejected
|1,266
|colspan="2"|
|- style="background:#E9E9E9;"
| style="text-align:left;" colspan="3"|Total
|227
|49
|49
|49
|–
|376,903
|100.00%
|
|-style="background:#E9E9E9;"
|colspan="8" align="left"|Eligible voters and turnout
|569,862
|66.14
|
|-
|colspan=15 align=left|Source : GNB 
|}

Incumbent MLAs who were defeated

Results by region

Detailed analysis

Campaign

Election call and initial reaction
At his election announcement, Progressive Conservative leader Blaine Higgs blamed the Liberals for the failure of negotiations that would have avoided an election until 2022 or the end of the pandemic. In response, Liberal leader Kevin Vickers and Green Party leader David Coon criticized Higgs for calling an election during a pandemic. Vickers insisted that the negotiations would have given unlimited power to Higgs and the PCs, and an election should have been held after the end of the pandemic. Meanwhile, People's Alliance leader Kris Austin asked New Brunswickers to vote for his party to ensure accountability of the next government by electing another minority legislature.

Impact of COVID-19
From the outset of the campaign, Higgs was asked about the potential impact of COVID-19 on the election. He initially caused confusion when he said that he would be able to suspend the election, if necessary, even though New Brunswick's Chief Electoral Officer Kim Poffenroth said that an election could not be stopped after it had been called. Additionally, Higgs suggested that he could turn to the COVID-19 emergency order declared by the province under the Emergency Measures Act (EMA), despite the fact that election timelines are exempt from the EMA. However, he remained firm that he did not intend to suspend the election. Higgs also shared that, because of COVID-19, PC candidates were instructed to avoid door-to-door campaigning and mailbox flyers during the election.

Candidate controversies
Roland Michaud, PC candidate in Victoria-La Vallée, was ordered to withdraw from the election by Blaine Higgs after a transphobic meme posted on Michaud's Facebook page became public; Michaud chose to remain and run as an independent. He remained on the ballot with his original affiliation because the papers had already been printed, as did other repudiated candidates.

John Wayne Gardner, Liberal candidate in Saint Croix, was ousted by party leader Kevin Vickers after an anti-LGBTQ2I tweet from 2017 came to light; Gardner announced later the same day that he would continue to run as an independent.

Louis Bérubé, PC candidate in Restigouche West, was allowed to remain as party candidate after transphobic social media comments mentioned in a 2016 Acadie Nouvelle story resurfaced. The party cited Bérubé's earlier apologies for his comments and his successful vetting before running for the Green Party in the 2019 election as reasons for his retention.

Heathere Collins, PANB candidate in Memramcook-Tantramar, was dropped by party leader Kris Austin after 2019 anti-Muslim Tweets came to light. The candidate, whose Elections NB registration disagreed with her Twitter account about how to spell her first name, remained in the election.

Opinion polls
Voting Intentions in New Brunswick since the 2018 Election

Candidates

Retiring incumbents 
The following sitting MLAs have announced that they would not seek re-election:

 Brian Kenny, Liberal MLA for Bathurst West-Beresford since 2014, and previously MLA for Bathurst from 2003 to 2014.
 Bruce Northrup, Progressive Conservative MLA for Sussex-Fundy-St. Martins since 2014, and previously MLA for Kings East from 2006 to 2014.
 Gerry Lowe, Liberal MLA for Saint John Harbour since 2018.
 Carl Urquhart, Progressive Conservative MLA for Carleton-York since 2014, and previously MLA for York from 2006 to 2014.
 Stewart Fairgrieve, Progressive Conservative MLA for Carleton since 2015.

Legend
bold denotes cabinet minister, speaker or party leader
† denotes an incumbent who is not running for re-election or was defeated in nomination contest
# denotes an incumbent seeking re-election in a new district

NOTE: Candidates' names are as registered with Elections New Brunswick

Northern

|-
| style="background:whitesmoke;"|Restigouche West
|
|Louis Bérubé124715.4%
||
|Gilles LePage502262.2%
|
|Charles Thériault175521.7%
|
|
|
|
|
|Travis Pollock (KISS)560.7%
||
|Gilles LePage
|-
| style="background:whitesmoke;"|Campbellton-Dalhousie
|
|Charles D. Stewart136919.7%
||
|Guy H. Arseneault454065.2%
|
|Marie-Christine Allard105415.1%
|
|
|
|
|
|
||
|Guy Arseneault
|-
| style="background:whitesmoke;"|Restigouche-Chaleur
|
|Louis Robichaud114916.7%
||
|Daniel Guitard382355.7%
|
|Marie Larivière189627.6%
|
|
|
|
|
|
||
|Daniel Guitard
|-
| style="background:whitesmoke;"|Bathurst West-Beresford
|
|Anne Bard-Lavigne198529.7%
||
|René Legacy373055.8%
|
|Pierre Duguay-Boudreau96514.4%
|
|
|
|
|
|
||
|Brian Kenny†
|-
| style="background:whitesmoke;"|Bathurst East-Nepisiguit-Saint-Isidore
|
|Amanda Keast156824.0%
||
|Denis Landry416363.8%
|
|Robert Kryzsko79812.2%
| 
|
|
|
|
|
||
|Denis Landry
|-
| style="background:whitesmoke;"|Caraquet
|
|Kevin J. Haché98512.0%
||
|Isabelle Thériault592872.3%
|
|Marie-Christine Haché129015.7%
|
|
|
|
|
|
||
|Isabelle Thériault
|-
| style="background:whitesmoke;"|Shippagan-Lamèque-Miscou
|
|Jean-Gérard Chiasson7148.8%
||
|Eric Mallet683483.8%
|
|Marie Leclerc6097.5%
|
|
|
|
|
|
||
|Robert Gauvin#
|-
| style="background:whitesmoke;"|Tracadie-Sheila
|
|Diane Carey205923.2%
||
|Keith Chiasson617569.5%
|
|Chris LeBlanc6457.3%
| 
|
|
|
|
|
||
|Keith Chiasson
|}

Miramichi

|-
| style="background:whitesmoke;"|Miramichi Bay-Neguac
|
|Robert Trevors275133.7%
||
|Lisa Harris356143.6%
|
|Curtis Bartibogue82510.1%
|
|Thomas L'Huillier89811.0%
|
|Douglas Mullin1391.7%
|
|
||
|Lisa Harris
|-
| style="background:whitesmoke;"|Miramichi
|
|Charles Barry150819.3%
|
|Kevin Vickers223928.6%
|
|Joshua Shaddick3985.1%
||
|Michelle Conroy352745.1%
|
|Eileen Clancy Teslenko921.2%
|
|Tristan Sutherland (Ind.)540.7%
||
|Michelle Conroy
|-
| style="background:whitesmoke;"|Southwest Miramichi-Bay du Vin
||
|Jake Stewart388748.0%
|
|Josh McCormack176021.7%
|
|
|
|Art O'Donnell226828.0%
|
|Glenna Hanley1882.3%
|
|
||
|Jake Stewart
|}

Southeastern

|-
| style="background:whitesmoke;"|Kent North
|
|Stephen Robertson136316.1%
|
|Bertrand LeBlanc293334.6%
||
|Kevin Arseneau402147.5%
|
|
|
|
|
|Roger Richard (Ind.)1541.8%
||
|Kevin Arseneau
|-
| style="background:whitesmoke;"|Kent South
|
|Raymond (Bou) Duplessis281730.2%
||
|Benoit Bourque514855.2%
|
|Eva P. Rehak99610.7%
|
|Lisa Godin2432.6%
|
|Sue Shedd1181.3%
|
|
||
|Benoît Bourque
|-
| style="background:whitesmoke;"|Shediac Bay-Dieppe
|
|Mathieu Gérald Caissie297130.6%
||
|Robert Gauvin583960.1%
|
|
|
|Phillip Coombes3713.8%
|
|Delphine Daigle5285.4%
|
|
||
|Vacant
|-
| style="background:whitesmoke;"|Shediac-Beaubassin-Cap-Pelé
|
|Marie-Paule Martin182019.7%
||
|Jacques LeBlanc494953.7%
|
|Gilles Cormier245326.6%
|
|
|
|
|
|
||
|Jacques LeBlanc
|-
| style="background:whitesmoke;"|Memramcook-Tantramar
|
|Carole Duguay167820.4%
|
|Maxime Bourgeois290235.3%
||
|Megan Mitton342541.6%
|
|Heathere Collins1922.3%
|
|
|
|Jefferson George Wright (Ind.)340.4%
||
|Megan Mitton
|-
| style="background:whitesmoke;"|Dieppe
|
|Patricia Arsenault168022.1%
||
|Roger Melanson456460.2%
|
|Mélyssa Boudreau114215.1%
|
|
|
|Pamela Boudreau2002.6%
|
|
||
|Roger Melanson
|-
| style="background:whitesmoke;"|Moncton East
||
|Daniel Allain352545.2%
|
|Monique LeBlanc275935.4%
|
|Phylomène Zangio98912.7%
|
|Michel Norman Guitare3784.8%
|
|Christopher Wanamaker1532.0%
|
|
||
|Monique LeBlanc
|-
| style="background:whitesmoke;"|Moncton Centre
|
|Jean Poirier164226.1%
||
|Rob McKee244838.9%
|
|Carole Chan172527.4%
|
|Aaron Richter3084.9%
|
|James Caldwell1682.7%
|
|
||
|Rob McKee
|-
| style="background:whitesmoke;"|Moncton South
||
|Greg Turner273442.1%
|
|Tyson Milner196630.3%
|
|Josephine Watson124519.2%
|
|Marilyn Crossman-Riel3315.1%
|
|Rebecca Rogers2203.4%
|
|
||
|Cathy Rogers†
|-
| style="background:whitesmoke;"|Moncton Northwest
||
|Ernie Steeves411151.5%
|
|Mark Black244830.7%
|
|Laura Sanderson7028.8%
|
|Shawn Soucoup4936.2%
|
|Cyprien Okana2292.9%
|
|
||
|Ernie Steeves
|-
| style="background:whitesmoke;"|Moncton Southwest
||
|Sherry Wilson367952.1%
|
|René Ephestion156122.1%
|
|Claire Kelly92713.1%
|
|Susan Matthews6679.5%
|
|Juliana McIntosh2243.2%
|
|
||
|Sherry Wilson
|-
| style="background:whitesmoke;"|Riverview
||
|R. Bruce Fitch469560.1%
|
|Heath Johnson128116.4%
|
|Rachel Pletz80010.2%
|
|Troy Berteit77810.0%
|
|John Nuttall2613.3%
|
|
||
|R. Bruce Fitch
|-
| style="background:whitesmoke;"|Albert
||
|Mike Holland504062.3%
|
|Kelley Nagle92111.4%
|
|Jenny O'Neill105613.1%
|
|Sharon Buchanan97712.1%
|
|
|
|James Wilson (Ind.)901.1%
||
|Mike Holland
|-
| style="background:whitesmoke;"|Gagetown-Petitcodiac
||
|Ross Wetmore477359.1%
|
|John (Jake) Urquhart86710.7%
|
|Marilyn Merritt-Gray100312.4%
|
|Craig Dykeman130316.1%
|
|Ryan Jewkes1311.6%
|
|
||
|Ross Wetmore
|}

Southern

|-
| style="background:whitesmoke;"|Sussex-Fundy-St. Martins
||
|Tammy Scott-Wallace436656.3%
|
|Cully Robinson97112.5%
|
|Tim Thompson96912.5%
|
|Jim Bedford132117.0%
|
|Jonas Lanz1291.7%
|
|
||
|Bruce Northrup†
|-
| style="background:whitesmoke;"|Hampton
||
||Gary E. Crossman435160.5%
|
|Carley Parish108415.1%
|
|John Carl Sabine81611.4%
|
|Sharon Bradley-Munn6879.6%
|
|Alex White2513.5%
|
|
||
|Gary Crossman
|-
| style="background:whitesmoke;"|Quispamsis
||
|Blaine M. Higgs569768.1%
|
|Robert Hunt122514.6%
|
|Addison Fach5286.3%
|
|Sara Hall4144.9%
|
|Caitlin Grogan5016.0%
|
|
||
|Blaine Higgs
|-
| style="background:whitesmoke;"|Rothesay
||
|Hugh J. (Ted) Flemming426561.3%
|
|Jason Hickey146321.0%
|
|Ann McAllister71910.3%
|
|Mike Griffin4135.9%
|
|
|
|Neville (NB) Barnett (Ind.)440.6%Liz Kramer (Ind.)560.6%
||
|Ted Flemming
|-
| style="background:whitesmoke;"|Saint John East
||
|Glen Savoie350756.4%
|
|Phil Comeau163926.3%
|
|Gerald Irish3946.3%
|
|Patrick Kemp4347.0%
|
|Josh Floyd2484.0%
|
|
||
|Glen Savoie
|-
| style="background:whitesmoke;"|Portland-Simonds
||
|Trevor A. Holder317055.1%
|
|Tim Jones165428.8%
|
|Stefan Warner4838.4%
|
|Darella (Lindsay) Jackson2824.9%
|
|Erik Heinze-Milne1642.9%
|
|
||
|Trevor Holder
|-
| style="background:whitesmoke;"|Saint John Harbour
||
|Arlene Dunn218141.4%
|
|Alice (Ms McKim) McKim120722.9%
|
|Brent Harris122423.2%
|
|Tony Gunn1863.5%
|
|Courtney Pyrke3095.9%
|
|Mike (Dok) Cyr (Ind.)470.9%Arty Watson (Ind.)1142.2%
||
|Gerry Lowe†
|-
| style="background:whitesmoke;"|Saint John Lancaster
||
|K. Dorothy Shephard356054.2%
|
|Sharon Teare147122.4%
|
|Joanna Killen93814.3%
|
|Paul Seelye3946.0%
|
|Don Durant2013.1%
|
|
||
|Dorothy Shephard
|-
| style="background:whitesmoke;"|Kings Centre
||
|Bill Oliver458361.5%
|
|Paul Adams91112.2%
|
|Bruce Dryer100613.5%
|
|William Edgett6939.3%
|
|Margaret Anderson Kilfoil2543.4%
|
|
||
|Bill Oliver
|-
| style="background:whitesmoke;"|Fundy-The Isles-Saint John West
||
|Andrea Anderson-Mason474066.5%
|
|Tony Mann72610.2%
|
|Lois P. Mitchell6869.6%
|
|Vincent P. Edgett6889.6%
|
|Sharon R. Greenlaw2914.1%
|
|
||
|Andrea Anderson-Mason
|-
| style="background:whitesmoke;"|Saint Croix
||
|Kathy Bockus357045.2%
|
|John Wayne Gardner4015.1%
|
|Kim Reeder123815.7%
|
|Rod Cumberland254632.2%
|
|Brad McKinney1471.9%
|
|
||
|Vacant
|}

Capital Region

|-
| style="background:whitesmoke;"|Oromocto-Lincoln-Fredericton
||
|Mary E. Wilson337444.3%
|
|Steven Burns207227.2%
|
|Gail Costello130617.1%
|
|Craig Rector7459.8%
|
|Natasha M. Akhtar1271.7%
|
|
||
|Mary E. Wilson
|-
| style="background:whitesmoke;"|Fredericton-Grand Lake
|
|Roy Wiggins247930.6%
|
|Eldon Hunter7499.3%
|
|Ken Washburn100512.4%
||
|Kris Austin375946.4%
|
|Greg Cook871.1%
|
|Grenville Woollacott (KISS)180.2%
||
|Kris Austin
|-
| style="background:whitesmoke;"|New Maryland-Sunbury
||
|Jeff Carr534257.8%
|
|Chris Pelkey104811.3%
|
|Jen Smith146315.8%
|
|Morris Shannon125413.6%
|
|Chris Thompson1411.5%
|
|
||
|Jeff Carr
|-
| style="background:whitesmoke;"|Fredericton South
|
|Brian MacKinnon234230.0%
|
|Nicole Picot89511.5%
||
|David Coon421354.0%
|
|Wendell Betts2343.0%
|
|Geoffrey Noseworthy1171.5%
|
|
||
|David Coon
|-
| style="background:whitesmoke;"|Fredericton North
||
|Jill Green322741.1%
|
|Stephen Horsman146418.7%
|
|Luke Randall246431.4%
|
|Allen Price5917.5%
|
|Mackenzie Thomason1001.3%
|
|
||
|Stephen Horsman
|-
| style="background:whitesmoke;"|Fredericton-York
||
|Ryan Cullins373042.4%
|
|Randy McKeen8729.9%
|
|Melissa Fraser211024.0%
|
|Rick DeSaulniers199122.6%
|
|Steven J. LaForest680.8%
|
|Gerald Bourque (KISS)240.3%
||
|Rick DeSaulniers
|-
| style="background:whitesmoke;"|Fredericton West-Hanwell
||
|Dominic Cardy472652.9%
|
|Chris Duffie151016.9%
|
|Susan Jonah174519.5%
|
|Mel Keeling8259.2%
|
|Armand Cormier1311.5%
|
|
||
|Dominic Cardy
|-
| style="background:whitesmoke;"|Carleton-York
||
|Richard Ames475057.8%
|
|Robert Kitchen94011.4%
|
|Louise Comeau89010.8%
|
|Gary Lemmon152418.6%
|
|Jarrett Oldenburg1101.3%
|
|
||
|Carl Urquhart†
|}

Upper River Valley

|-
| style="background:whitesmoke;"|Carleton
||
|Bill Hogan353647.9%
|
|Theresa Blackburn123916.8%
|
|Greg Crouse5817.9%
|
|Graham Gill190925.8%
|
|Shawn Oldenburg801.1%
|
|Andy Walton (KISS)410.6%
||
|Stewart Fairgrieve†
|-
|style="background:whitesmoke;"|Carleton-Victoria
||
|Margaret Johnson333045.2%
|
|Andrew Harvey293939.9%
|
|Rowan Patrick Miller3725.1%
|
|Terry Leigh Sisson6108.3%
|
|Meriet Gray Miller1131.5%
|
|
||
|Andrew Harvey
|-
| style="background:whitesmoke;"|Victoria-La Vallée
|
|Roland Michaud207128.6%
||
|Chuck Chiasson436560.2%
|
|Nathanaël Denis Lavoie4265.9%
|
|André Jobin2924.0%
|
|
|
|Danny Zolondek (Ind.)921.3%
||
|Chuck Chiasson
|-
| style="background:whitesmoke;"|Edmundston-Madawaska Centre
|
|Joanne Bérubé Gagné138019.6%
||
|Jean-Claude (JC) D'Amours523674.5%
|
|Marco Morency4155.9%
|
|
|
|
|
|
||
|Jean-Claude (JC) D'Amours
|-
| style="background:whitesmoke;"|Madawaska Les Lacs-Edmundston
|
|Marie-Eve Castonguay176325.6%
||
|Francine Landry458366.5%
|
|Marie-Soleil Lussier5427.9%
|
|
|
|
|
|
||
|Francine Landry
|}

Notes

References

Further reading

External links
 

Elections in New Brunswick
New Brunswick
2020 in New Brunswick
September 2020 events in Canada